Jordan Ivey (born 29 October 1992) is an Australian rules footballer who plays for Melbourne in the AFL Women's competition (AFLW). She previously played for Carlton and Geelong.

AFL Women's career

She was recruited by Carlton Football Club as an injury replacement player mid-way through the 2017 season. She made her debut in Carlton's round 6, 2017 match against  at Domain Stadium. She was delisted at season's end after having played two matches.

In May 2018 Ivey accepted an offer from expansion club  to play with the club in the 2019 AFLW season. She has since played 31 games for the club and was vice-captain in 2021. On 2 June 2022, Ivey was traded to Melbourne.

References

External links 

Living people
1992 births
Carlton Football Club (AFLW) players
Australian rules footballers from Victoria (Australia)
Sportswomen from Victoria (Australia)
Geelong Football Club (AFLW) players